The 1969–70 Spartan League season was the 52nd in the history of Spartan League. The league consisted of 18 teams.

League table

The division featured 18 teams, all from last season.

References

1969-70
9